Jacob Kohnstamm (born 14 November 1949) is a retired Dutch politician and jurist who was State Secretary for the Interior from 1994 to 1998. He is a member of the Democrats 66 (D66), which he chaired from 1982 to 1986.

Biography

Studies and early career
Kohnstamm attended a Gymnasium in The Hague from April 1962 until May 1968 and applied at the University of Amsterdam in June 1971 majoring in Law and obtaining an Bachelor of Laws degree in June 1973 and worked as a student researcher before graduating with an Master of Laws degree in July 1977. Kohnstamm worked as a criminal defense lawyer in Amsterdam from October 1977 until June 1981.

House of Representatives
Kohnstamm was elected as a member of the House of Representatives after the election of 1981, taking office on 10 June 1981 serving as a backbencher. After the election of 1982 Kohnstamm was not reelected and he continued to serve until the end of the parliamentary term on 16 September 1982. Kohnstamm again worked as a criminal defense lawyer in Amsterdam from September 1982 until June 1986. Kohnstamm served as Chairman of the Democrats 66 from 30 October 1982 until 20 May 1986.

After the election of 1986 Kohnstamm returned as a member of the House of Representatives, taking office on 3 June 1986 serving as a frontbencher chairing the parliamentary committee for Law enforcement and parliamentary committee for the Ombudsman and spokesperson for the Interior, Justice, Law enforcement, Health, Civil Service and Abortion and deputy spokesperson for Foreign Affairs, European Affairs and the Benelux Union.

State Secretary for the Interior
After the election of 1994 Kohnstamm was appointed as State Secretary for the Interior under the first cabinet of Prime Minister Wim Kok, taking office on 22 August 1994. He was tasked with public security, emergency services, emergency management and urban planning. In December 1997 Kohnstamm announced that he would not stand for the election of 1998. Following the cabinet formation of 1998, Kohnstamm asked not to be considered for a post in the new cabinet; the First Kok cabinet was replaced by the Second Kok cabinet on 3 August 1998.

Late career
Kohnstamm remained in active in national politics; he was elected as a member of the Senate after the 1999 election, taking office on 8 June. He served as a frontbencher and chaired the special parliamentary committee for the European Court of Justice and spokesperson for Foreign Affairs, Justice, Health, European Affairs, NATO and the Benelux Union. He left the Senate on 7 September 2004.

Decorations

External links

Official
  Mr. J. (Jacob) Kohnstamm Parlement & Politiek
  Mr. J. Kohnstamm (D66) Eerste Kamer der Staten-Generaal

 

 
 
 

 

 
 

1949 births
Living people
Abortion-rights activists
Businesspeople from Amsterdam
Chairmen of the Democrats 66
Copyright activists
Criminal defense lawyers
Democrats 66 politicians
Dutch corporate directors
Dutch human rights activists
Dutch humanists
Dutch lobbyists
Dutch nonprofit directors
Dutch nonprofit executives
Dutch political activists
Dutch people of German-Jewish descent
Dutch public broadcasting administrators
Dutch women's rights activists
European Union lobbyists
Euthanasia activists
Euthanasia in the Netherlands
Humanistic Jews
Jewish activists
Jewish Dutch politicians
Jewish humanists
Knights of the Order of Orange-Nassau
Members of the Senate (Netherlands)
Members of the House of Representatives (Netherlands)
Lawyers from Amsterdam
People from Wassenaar
Privacy activists
State Secretaries for the Interior of the Netherlands
University of Amsterdam alumni
Academic staff of the University of Amsterdam
20th-century Dutch businesspeople
20th-century Dutch civil servants
20th-century Dutch jurists
20th-century Dutch lawyers
20th-century Dutch politicians
21st-century Dutch businesspeople
21st-century Dutch civil servants
21st-century Dutch jurists
21st-century Dutch lawyers
21st-century Dutch politicians
20th-century Dutch women